The 1897 Michigan State Normal Normalites football team represented Michigan State Normal School (later renamed Eastern Michigan University) during the 1897 college football season.  In their first and only season under head coach Andrew Bird Glaspie, the Normalites compiled a record of 2–3 and were outscored by their opponents by a combined total of 62 to 36. George L. Wilson was the team captain.

Schedule

References

Michigan State Normal
Eastern Michigan Eagles football seasons
Michigan State Normal Normalites football